Aleksandr Ivanovich Lenyov (25 September 1944 – 12 November 2021) was a Soviet and Russian former professional footballer who played as a midfielder or defender.

International career
Lenyov earned ten caps for the USSR national team, and participated in UEFA Euro 1968.

Honours
 Soviet Top League: 1965
 Soviet Cup: 1968

Death
He died on 12 November 2021, after a long illness.

References

External links
Profile (in Russian)

1944 births
2021 deaths
Russian footballers
Soviet footballers
Association football midfielders
Association football defenders
Soviet Union international footballers
UEFA Euro 1968 players
Soviet Top League players
FC Shinnik Yaroslavl players
FC Torpedo Moscow players
FC Volga Nizhny Novgorod players
FC Arsenal Tula players
Sportspeople from Tula Oblast
People from Novomoskovsky District